David Osborne Hamilton (June 19, 1893 – January 30, 1953) was an American poet.

He edited the Yale Literary Magazine.
His work appeared in Measure, and The Century Magazine.

Awards
 1920 Yale Series of Younger Poets Competition

Works
"Our Time", Poetry, 1921

 Picaresque, C. Scribner's sons, 1930

Anthologies

 ”Elizabeth” “May” “November” “A Portrait” & “To Men Unborn”, Michigan Poets: 1936

References

External links
 
 

20th-century American poets
1893 births
Yale University alumni
Yale Younger Poets winners
1953 deaths